The Edmonton Flyers are a defunct ice hockey team that was based in Edmonton, Alberta, Canada. The team existed from 1940 until 1963. The Flyers played in the Edmonton Gardens.

The Flyers were nominated by W. G. Hardy to represent Canada at the 1947 Ice Hockey World Championships, but the Canadian Amateur Hockey Association ultimately did not to send a team due to funding issues.

The Flyers won the 1948 Allan Cup as Canadian senior hockey champions. The Flyers later won three Lester Patrick Cups as Western Hockey League champions.

The Flyers were a minor league affiliate of the National Hockey League's Detroit Red Wings during their tenure in the WHL.  During this time, many future NHL stars passed through the Flyers organization. Among them were Al Arbour, Johnny Bucyk, Glenn Hall, Bronco Horvath, and Norm Ullman.

Season-by-season record
The Flyers played in the following leagues:

1940-41: Alberta Senior Hockey League (amateur)
1941-45: Did not operate (World War II)
1945-51: Western Canada Senior Hockey League (amateur)
1951-52: Pacific Coast Hockey League (minor professional)
1952-63: Western Hockey League (minor professional)

Note: GP = Games played, W = Wins, L = Losses, T = Ties Pts = Points, GF = Goals for, GA = Goals against

Notable alumni
List of Edmonton Flyers alumni who played more than 100 games in Edmonton and 100 or more games in the National Hockey League.

See also
List of ice hockey teams in Alberta

References

External links
oilersheritage.com - Edmonton Flyers
hockeyleaguehistory.com WCSHL standings

Alberta Senior Hockey League teams
Defunct ice hockey teams in Alberta
Fly
Ice hockey clubs established in 1940
Sports clubs disestablished in 1963
1940 establishments in Alberta
1963 disestablishments in Alberta
Western Hockey League (1952–1974) teams